The Special Warfare Training Centre (: SWTC; ; Jawi: ڤوست لاتيهن ڤڤراڠن خصوص) is a Malaysian Army training centre located at the Sungai Udang Camp in Malacca. The primary purpose is to provide basic commando courses and specialised courses and training for personnel from the 21st Special Service Group, 10th Parachute Brigade, and elite units of the Malaysian Armed Forces (MAF) to strengthen the Malaysian defensive garrison against enemies and terrorists.

SWTC also provides training to personnel from the Royal Malaysian Police, the Malaysian Coast Guard, the Johor Military Force, and the special operations forces of neighbouring nations, such as Brunei, Myanmar, and the Maldives.

SWTC is managed by the 21st Special Service Group and administered by the Malaysian Army Training and Doctrine Command. The technical control of SWTC is overseen by the Special Forces Operation Cell of the Operations and Training Wing of the Malaysian Army Command.

History 
Regional political and military changes in Southeast Asia have led to the idea of establishing a special training facility to train personnel with specialised knowledge, particularly for Gerak Khas members. The training centre was established on 1 August 1976, at Sungai Udang Camp in Malacca as Pusat Latihan Peperangan Khas Angkatan Tentera Malaysia (PLPK ATM). On 1 January 1977, the centre became fully operational. Prior to the creation of PLPK, every MAF's special operations personnel received specialised training at overseas military academies. The rising expense of sending them overseas is another factor in the development of PLPK. Before the foundation of PLPK, members of the 1st Malaysian Special Service Regiment (now known as the 21st Commando Regiment) conducted fundamental courses such as the Basic Commando Course.

PLPK ATM was renamed Pusat Latihan Peperangan Khas Tentera Darat (PLPK TD) in 1985, after the Royal Malaysian Navy (RMN) and Royal Malaysian Air Force (RMAF) each established their own special operations training centre at their respective bases. PLPK TD changed its name once more in 1995, when all training institutes under the Malaysian Army were renamed in accordance with the creation of the Army Training Administration. It is currently called the Special Warfare Training Centre and is administered by the Malaysian Army Training and Doctrine Command.

Roles 
SWTC's objective is to provide specialised training and courses to all military personnel in accordance with the present situation. SWTC tasks include:
 To conduct basic commando training for the Malaysian Army and other military services.
 To train personnel of special operations forces as well as regular soldiers in specialised training and special operations as required by higher authority.
 To conduct advanced training for special operations forces and army personnel as directed by higher authority.
 To conduct training evaluation tests on special operations forces.
 To provide observers and qualified instructors for specialised assignments in special operations forces.
 To revise and analyse all doctrines pertaining to specialised training and operations.

Training Module 
Most of the SWTC instructors come from the 21st Special Service Group and the 10th Parachute Brigade. They keep their knowledge and skills up-to-date by going to military schools in other countries. 

At SWTC, there are five training wings, each of which offers specialised courses.

Commando Wing 
 Basic Commando Course
 Sniper Course
 Sniper Supervisor Course
 Mountaineering Course
 Mountaineering Supervisor Course

Special Stratagem Wing 
 Small Unit Patrol Course
 Patrol Leader Course
 Patrol Sergeant Course
 Patrol Officer Course
 Close Quarter Battle (CQB) Course
 Abseiling Supervisor Course

Parachute Wing 
 Basic Parachute Course
 Jumpmaster Course
 Basic Free Fall Course
 Advanced Free Fall Course (HAHO/HALO)
 Static Ramp Air Course
 Parachute Instructor Course (Static Line)
 Parachute Instructor Course (Free Fall)
 Pandura (Pathfinder) Course

Rigger Wing 
 Basic Parachute Rigger and Maintenance Course
 Inspector of Rigging and Maintenance

Amphibious Wing 
 Small Boat Coxswains Course
 Basic Diving Course
 Diving Instructor Course
 Combat Swimmer Course
 Combat Swimmer Assistant Leader Course
 Combat Swimmer Leader Course
 Special Demolition Course

Former Commandant

Notes

References 

Malaysian Army
Military installations of Malaysia
Military training facilities
Military education and training in Malaysia